The women's RS:X is a sailing event on the Sailing at the 2020 Summer Olympics program in Tokyo that took place between 25 and 31 July at Enoshima Yacht Harbor. Thirteen races (the last one a medal race) are scheduled.

Medals were presented by IOC Member for Israel, Mr Alex Gilady and World Sailing President Li Quanhai.

Schedule

Results

References 

Women's RS:X
RS:X
Women's events at the 2020 Summer Olympics